Graeme Swindles is a geoscientist from Northern Ireland, currently a Professor of Physical Geography at Queen's University Belfast.

Career
Swindles was Associate Professor of Earth System Dynamics at the University of Leeds and lecturer in Physical Geography and Archaeology at the University of Bradford. He is an earth system scientist with broad research interests in past-present-future climate change. His main research foci include peatland ecosystems, climate change and human-environment relations.

Research work
Swindles was awarded the Lewis Penny Medal by the Quaternary Research Association in 2012. He has made contributions to the fields of earth system science, peatland science, climate change, and palaeo- and neo-ecology and that volcanic eruptions may increase as the planet warms.

Selected publications
Charman DJ, Beilman DW, Blaauw M, Booth RK, Brewer S, Chambers FM, Christen JA, Gallego-Sala A, Harrison SP, Hughes PD, Jackson ST. Climate-related changes in peatland carbon accumulation during the last millennium. Biogeosciences. 2013 Feb 8;10(2):929-44.  (Cited 288 times, according to Google Scholar  ) 
Swindles, G.T., Morris, P.J., Mullan, D.J., Payne, R.J., Roland, T.P., Amesbury, M.J., Lamentowicz, M., Turner, T.E., Gallego-Sala, A., Sim, T., Barr, I.D., Blaauw, M., Blundell, A., Chambers, F.M., Charman, D.J., Feurdean, A., Galloway, J.M., Gałka, M., Green, S., Kajukało, K., Karofeld, E., Korhola, A., Lamentowicz, L., Langdon, P., Marcisz, K., Mauquoy, D., Mazei, Y.A., McKeown, M., Mitchell, E.A.D., Novenko, E., Plunkett, G., Roe, H.M., Schoning, K., Sillasoo, Ü., Tsyganov, A.N., van der Linden, M., Väliranta, M. and Warner, B. 2019.Widespread drying of European peatlands in recent centuries. Nature Geoscience 12, 922–928.   (Cited 85 times, according to Google Scholar.)  
Morris, P.J., Swindles, G.T., Valdes, P., Ivanovic, R., Gregoire, L., Smith, M., Tarasov, L., Haywood, A. and Bacon, K. 2018 Global peatland initiation driven by regionally-asynchronous warming]. Proceedings of the National Academy of Sciences 115, 4851–4856..  (open access) (Cited 72 times, according to Google Scholar.)  
Swindles, G.T., Watson, E.J., Savov, I.P., Lawson, I.T., Schmidt, A., Hooper, A., Cooper, C.L., Connor, C.B., Gloor, M. and Carrivick, J.L. 2018.  Climatic control on Icelandic volcanic activity during the mid-Holocene  Geology 46, 47–50.  (Cited 31 times, according to Google Scholar.)  
Swindles, G.T., Morris, P.J., Whitney, B., Galloway, J.M., Gałka, M., Gallego-Sala, A., Macumber, A.L., Mullan, D., Smith, M.W., Amesbury, M.J., Roland, T.P., Sanei, H., Patterson, R.T., Sanderson, N., Parry, L., Charman, D.J., Lopez, O., Valderamma, E., Watson, E.J., Ivanovic, R.F., Valdes, P.J., Turner, T.E. and Lähteenoja, O. 2018.  Ecosystem state shifts during long-term development of an Amazonian peatland]. Global Change Biology 24, 738–757..  (Cited22 times, according to Google Scholar.)   
Swindles, G.T., Morris, P.J., Mullan, D., Watson, E.J., Turner, T.E., Roland, T., Amesbury, M.J., Kokfelt, U., Schoning, K., Pratte, S., Gallego-Sala, A., Charman, D.J., Sanderson, N., Garneau, M., Carrivick, J.L., Woulds, C., Holden, J., Parry, L. and Galloway, J.M. 2015. The long-term fate of permafrost peatlands under rapid climate warming . Scientific Reports 5, 17951.

References

External links 
 

Living people
Year of birth missing (living people)
Academics of Queen's University Belfast